The following is a list of baseball sports video games.

Franchises
 All-Star Baseball
 Backyard Baseball
 Baseball Simulator 1.000
 Baseball Starsf
 Bases Loaded (Moero!! Pro Yakyū)
 Champion Baseball
 Chōkūkan Night: Pro Yakyū King
 Family Stadium (Extra Bases)
 Kōshien
 Mario Baseball
 MLB
 MLB 2K
 MLB: The Show
 MVP Baseball
 Power Pros (Jikkyō Powerful Pro Yakyū)
 Professional Baseball Spirits (Pro Yakyū Spirits)
 R.B.I. Baseball
 Super Mega Baseball
 Triple Play
 World Stadium (Great Sluggers)

Games
{| class="wikitable sortable" style="width:95%;"
|-
! Title
! Release date
! Platform
! Developer
! Publisher
! MLB/NPB License
! MLBPA/JPBPA License
|-
| style="text-align:center;"| BBC Vik: The Baseball Demonstrator
| style="text-align:center;"| 1961
| style="text-align:center;"| IBM 1620
| style="text-align:center;"| John Burgeson
| style="text-align:center;"| IBM
| 
| 
|-
| style="text-align:center;"| Baseball
| style="text-align:center;"| 1971
| style="text-align:center;"| PDP-10
| style="text-align:center;"| Don Daglow
| style="text-align:center;"| DEC
| 
| 
|-
| style="text-align:center;"| Baseball
| style="text-align:center;"| 1972
| style="text-align:center;"| Odyssey
| style="text-align:center;"| Magnavox
| style="text-align:center;"| Magnavox
| 
| 
|-
| style="text-align:center;"| Tornado Baseball
| style="text-align:center;"| 1976
| style="text-align:center;"| ArcadeAstrocade
| style="text-align:center;"| Midway
| style="text-align:center;"| Midway
| 
| 
|- style="text-align:center;"
|| Baseball
|| 1977
|| RCA Studio II
|| RCA
|| RCA
| 
| 
|-
|- style="text-align:center;"
|| Baseball
|| 1977
|| Commodore PET
|| Bob Polaro
|| Commodore
| 
| 
|-
| style="text-align:center;"| Videocart 12: Baseball
| style="text-align:center;"| 1977
| style="text-align:center;"| Channel F
| style="text-align:center;"| Fairchild
| style="text-align:center;"| Fairchild
| 
| 
|- style="text-align:center;"
|| Baseball!
|| 1978
|| Odyssey²
|| Magnavox
|| Magnavox
| 
| 
|- style="text-align:center;"
|| Home Run
|| 1978
|| Atari 2600
|| Atari
|| Atari
| 
| 
|-
| style="text-align:center;"| Atari Baseball
| style="text-align:center;"| 1979
| style="text-align:center;"| Arcade
| style="text-align:center;"| Atari
| style="text-align:center;"| Atari
| 
| 
|-
| style="text-align:center;"| Ball Park
| style="text-align:center;"| 1979
| style="text-align:center;"| Arcade
| style="text-align:center;"| Taito
| style="text-align:center;"| Taito
| 
| 
|- style="text-align:center;"
|| Major League Baseball
|| 1980
|| Intellivision
|| APh Technological Consulting
|| Mattel
| 
| 
|- style="text-align:center;"
|| Baseball
|| 1980
|| Microvision
|| Mattel
|| Mattel
| 
| 
|-
| style="text-align:center;"| Computer Baseball
| style="text-align:center;"| 1981
| style="text-align:center;"| Apple IICommodore 64
| style="text-align:center;"| SSI
| style="text-align:center;"| SSI
| 
| 
|- style="text-align:center;"
|| Star League Baseball
|| 1983
|| Atari 8-bit familyCommodore 64
|| Gamestar
|| Activision
| 
| 
|- style="text-align:center;"
|| MicroLeague Baseball
|| 1983
|| Commodore 64Atari 8-bit family
|| MicroLeague
|| Commodore International
| 
| 
|- style="text-align:center;"
|| Super Challenge Baseball
|| 1982
|| Atari 2600
|| Mattel
|| Atari
| 
| 
|-
| style="text-align:center;"| Baseball
| style="text-align:center;"| 1983
| style="text-align:center;"| NES
| style="text-align:center;"| Nintendo
| style="text-align:center;"| Nintendo
| 
| 
|-
| style="text-align:center;"| Champion Baseball
| style="text-align:center;"| 1983
| style="text-align:center;"| Arcade
| style="text-align:center;"| Alpha Denshi
| style="text-align:center;"| Sega
| 
| 
|- style="text-align:center;"
|| Intellivision World Series Baseball
|| 1983
|| Intellivision
|| Don Daglow & Eddie Dombrower
|| Mattel
| 
| 
|- style="text-align:center;"
|| RealSports Baseball
|| 1982
|| Atari 2600Atari 5200Atari 7800
|| Atari
|| Atari
| 
| 
|- style="text-align:center;"
|| Super Action Baseball
|| 1983
|| Colecovision
|| Coleco
|| Coleco
| 
| 
|- style="text-align:center;"
|| World Championship Baseball
|| 1985
|| Intellivision
|| APh Technological Consuling
|| INTV Corp
| 
| 
|-
| style="text-align:center;"| Hardball!
| style="text-align:center;"| 19851991
| style="text-align:center;"| Commodore 64Atari 8-bit familySega Genesis
| style="text-align:center;"| Accolade
| style="text-align:center;"| Accolade
| 
| 
|- style="text-align:center;"
|-
| style="text-align:center;"| World Series - The Season
| style="text-align:center;"| 1985
| style="text-align:center;"| Arcade
| style="text-align:center;"| Cinematronics
| style="text-align:center;"| Cinematronics
| 
| 
|- style="text-align:center;"
|-
| style="text-align:center;"| Pro Baseball: Family Stadium (Pro Yakyu Family Stadium)
| style="text-align:center;"| 1986/12/10
| style="text-align:center;"| Family Computer
| style="text-align:center;"| Namco
| style="text-align:center;"| Namco
| 
| 
|- style="text-align:center;"
|-
| style="text-align:center;"| Atari R.B.I Baseball
| style="text-align:center;"| 1987/09
| style="text-align:center;"| Arcade
| style="text-align:center;"| Namco / Atari
| style="text-align:center;"| Atari
| 
| 
|-
| style="text-align:center;"| Earl Weaver Baseball
| style="text-align:center;"| 1987
| style="text-align:center;"| AmigaPC
| style="text-align:center;"| Don Daglow & Eddie Dombrower
| style="text-align:center;"| Electronic Arts
| 
| 
|-
| style="text-align:center;"| Great Baseball
| style="text-align:center;"| 1987
| style="text-align:center;"| Sega Master System
| style="text-align:center;"| Sega
| style="text-align:center;"| Sega
| 
| 
|-
| style="text-align:center;"| R.B.I. Baseball
| style="text-align:center;"| 1988
| style="text-align:center;"| NES
| style="text-align:center;"| Namco / Atari
| style="text-align:center;"| Tengen
| 
| 
|-
| style="text-align:center;"| Super Baseball
| style="text-align:center;"| 1988
| style="text-align:center;"| NES
| style="text-align:center;"| Atari
| style="text-align:center;"| Atari
| 
| 
|- style="text-align:center;"
|| Reggie Jackson Baseball/American Baseball
|| 1988
|| Sega Master System
|| Sega
|| Sega
| 
| 
|-
| style="text-align:center;"| Major League Baseball
| style="text-align:center;"| 1988/04
| style="text-align:center;"| NES
| style="text-align:center;"| Enteractive
| style="text-align:center;"| LJN
| 
| 
|-
| style="text-align:center;"| Bases Loaded
| style="text-align:center;"| 1988/07
| style="text-align:center;"| NES
| style="text-align:center;"| TOSE
| style="text-align:center;"| Jaleco Entertainment
| 
| 
|-
| style="text-align:center;"| Major League
| style="text-align:center;"| 1989
| style="text-align:center;"| NES
| style="text-align:center;"| Lenar
| style="text-align:center;"| Irem
|
|
|-
| style="text-align:center;"| Pete Rose Baseball
| style="text-align:center;"| 1989
| style="text-align:center;"| Atari 2600Atari 7800
| style="text-align:center;"| Absolute
| style="text-align:center;"| Absolute
| 
| 
|-
| style="text-align:center;"| Tommy Lasorda Baseball
| style="text-align:center;"| 1989
| style="text-align:center;"| Genesis
| style="text-align:center;"| Sega
| style="text-align:center;"| Sega
| 
| 
|-
| style="text-align:center;"| Baseball Simulator 1.000
| style="text-align:center;"| 1989
| style="text-align:center;"| NES
| style="text-align:center;"| Culture Brain
| style="text-align:center;"| Culture Brain
| 
| 
|-
| style="text-align:center;"| Tecmo Baseball
| style="text-align:center;"| 1989/01
| style="text-align:center;"| NES
| style="text-align:center;"| Tecmo
| style="text-align:center;"| Tecmo
| 
| 
|-
| style="text-align:center;"| Baseball Stars
| style="text-align:center;"| 1989/07
| style="text-align:center;"| NES
| style="text-align:center;"| SNK
| style="text-align:center;"| Nintendo
| 
| 
|-
| style="text-align:center;"| Dusty Diamond's All-Star Softball
| style="text-align:center;"| 1990
| style="text-align:center;"| NES
| style="text-align:center;"| TOSE
| style="text-align:center;"| Broderbund
| 
| 
|-
| style="text-align:center;"| R.B.I. Baseball 2
| style="text-align:center;"| 1990
| style="text-align:center;"| NES
| style="text-align:center;"| Atari Games
| style="text-align:center;"| Tengen
| 
| 
|-
| style="text-align:center;"| Bases Loaded II: Second Season
| style="text-align:center;"| 1990/02
| style="text-align:center;"| NES
| style="text-align:center;"| TOSE
| style="text-align:center;"| Jaleco Entertainment
| 
| 
|-
| style="text-align:center;"| Bad News Baseball
| style="text-align:center;"| 1990/06
| style="text-align:center;"| NES
| style="text-align:center;"| Tecmo
| style="text-align:center;"| Tecmo
| 
| 
|-
| style="text-align:center;"| Little League Baseball: Championship Series
| style="text-align:center;"| 1990/06
| style="text-align:center;"| NES
| style="text-align:center;"| SNK
| style="text-align:center;"| SNK
| 
| 
|-
| style="text-align:center;"| R.B.I. Baseball 3
| style="text-align:center;"| 1991
| style="text-align:center;"| NESGenesis
| style="text-align:center;"| Atari Games
| style="text-align:center;"| Tengen
| 
| 
|-
| style="text-align:center;"| Bo Jackson Baseball
| style="text-align:center;"| 1991
| style="text-align:center;"| PCNES
| style="text-align:center;"| Data East
| style="text-align:center;"| Data East
| 
| 
|-
| style="text-align:center;"| Extra Innings (video game)
| style="text-align:center;"| 1991
| style="text-align:center;"| SNES
| style="text-align:center;"| Sting
| style="text-align:center;"| Sony Imagesoft
| 
| 
|-
| style="text-align:center;"| Hardball II
| style="text-align:center;"| 1991
| style="text-align:center;"| PC
| style="text-align:center;"| Distinctive Interactive
| style="text-align:center;"| Accolade
| 
| 
|-
| style="text-align:center;"| Base Wars
| style="text-align:center;"| 1991/06
| style="text-align:center;"| NES
| style="text-align:center;"| Ultra Games
| style="text-align:center;"| Konami
| 
| 
|-
| style="text-align:center;"| Roger Clemens' MVP Baseball
| style="text-align:center;"| 1991
| style="text-align:center;"| NES
| style="text-align:center;"| LJN
| style="text-align:center;"| LJN
| 
| 
|-
| style="text-align:center;"| Super Baseball Simulator 1.000
| style="text-align:center;"| 1991/12
| style="text-align:center;"| SNES
| style="text-align:center;"| Culture Brain
| style="text-align:center;"| Culture Brain
| 
| 
|-
| style="text-align:center;"| Super Bases Loaded
| style="text-align:center;"| 1991
| style="text-align:center;"| SNES
| style="text-align:center;"| TOSE
| style="text-align:center;"| Jaleco
| 
| 
|-
| style="text-align:center;"| Baseball Stars Professional
| style="text-align:center;"| 1991/07/01
| style="text-align:center;"| Neo-Geo
| style="text-align:center;"| SNK
| style="text-align:center;"| SNK
| 
| 
|-
| style="text-align:center;"| Bases Loaded III
| style="text-align:center;"| 1991/09
| style="text-align:center;"| NES
| style="text-align:center;"| TOSE
| style="text-align:center;"| Jaleco Entertainment
| 
| 
|-
| style="text-align:center;"| R.B.I. Baseball 4
| style="text-align:center;"| 1992
| style="text-align:center;"| Genesis
| style="text-align:center;"| Tengen
| style="text-align:center;"| Tengen
| 
| 
|-
| style="text-align:center;"| Cal Ripken Jr. Baseball
| style="text-align:center;"| 1992
| style="text-align:center;"| SNESGenesis
| style="text-align:center;"| Mindscape
| style="text-align:center;"| Mindscape
| 
| 
|-
| style="text-align:center;"| Nolan Ryan's Baseball
| style="text-align:center;"| 1992
| style="text-align:center;"| SNES
| style="text-align:center;"| Affect
| style="text-align:center;"| Romstar
| 
| 
|-
| style="text-align:center;"| Roger Clemens' MVP Baseball
| style="text-align:center;"| 1992
| style="text-align:center;"| SNES
| style="text-align:center;"| Sculptured Software
| style="text-align:center;"| LJN
| 
| 
|-
| style="text-align:center;"| Baseball Stars 2
| style="text-align:center;"| 1992
| style="text-align:center;"| NES, Neo-Geo
| style="text-align:center;"| Eikichi Kawasaki and team
| style="text-align:center;"| Romstar
| 
| 
|-
| style="text-align:center;"| Sports Talk Baseball
| style="text-align:center;"| 1992
| style="text-align:center;"| Genesis
| style="text-align:center;"| Sega
| style="text-align:center;"| Sega
| 
| 
|-
| style="text-align:center;"| Super Batter Up
| style="text-align:center;"| 1992/10
| style="text-align:center;"| SNES
| style="text-align:center;"| Namco
| style="text-align:center;"| Namco
| 
| 
|-
| style="text-align:center;"| Tony La Russa Baseball
| style="text-align:center;"| 1992
| style="text-align:center;"| Genesis
| style="text-align:center;"| Stormfront Studios
| style="text-align:center;"| Electronic Arts
| 
| 
|-
| style="text-align:center;"| Super Baseball 2020
| style="text-align:center;"| 19931994/03/031995/02/25
| style="text-align:center;"| SNESGenesisNeo-Geo
| style="text-align:center;"| TradewestNuFXSNK
| style="text-align:center;"| SNKElectronic ArtsSNK
| 
| 
|-
| style="text-align:center;"| Tony La Russa Baseball II
| style="text-align:center;"| 1993
| style="text-align:center;"| PC
| style="text-align:center;"| Stormfront Studios
| style="text-align:center;"| SSI
| 
| 
|-
| style="text-align:center;"| Bases Loaded 4
| style="text-align:center;"| 1993/04
| style="text-align:center;"| NES
| style="text-align:center;"| TOSE
| style="text-align:center;"| Jaleco Entertainment
| 
| 
|-
| style="text-align:center;"| R.B.I. Baseball '93
| style="text-align:center;"| 1993
| style="text-align:center;"| Genesis
| style="text-align:center;"| Tengen
| style="text-align:center;"| Tengen
| 
| 
|- style="text-align:center;"
|| Roger Clemens' MVP Baseball
|| 1993/08/27
|| Game Boy
|| Sculptured Software
|| Acclaim Japan
| 
| 
|-
| style="text-align:center;"| Ken Griffey, Jr. Presents Major League Baseball
| style="text-align:center;"| 1994
| style="text-align:center;"| SNES
| style="text-align:center;"| Software Creations
| style="text-align:center;"| Nintendo
| 
| 
|-
| style="text-align:center;"| MLBPA Baseball
| style="text-align:center;"| 1994
| style="text-align:center;"| SNESGenesis
| style="text-align:center;"| Visual Concepts
| style="text-align:center;"| EA Sports
| 
| 
|-
| style="text-align:center;"| R.B.I. Baseball '94
| style="text-align:center;"| 1994
| style="text-align:center;"| Genesis
| style="text-align:center;"| Tengen
| style="text-align:center;"| Tengen
| 
| 
|-
| style="text-align:center;"| Sports Illustrated: Championship Football & Baseball
| style="text-align:center;"| 1994
| style="text-align:center;"| SNES
| style="text-align:center;"| Malibu Games
| style="text-align:center;"| Mailbu Games
| 
| 
|-
| style="text-align:center;"| Relief Pitcher
| style="text-align:center;"| 1994/05
| style="text-align:center;"| SNES
| style="text-align:center;"| Left Field Productions
| style="text-align:center;"| Tengen
| 
| 
|-
| style="text-align:center;"| World Series Baseball
| style="text-align:center;"| 1994 (spring)
| style="text-align:center;"| Genesis
| style="text-align:center;"| Blue Sky Software
| style="text-align:center;"| Sega
| 
| 
|-
| style="text-align:center;"| ESPN Baseball Tonight
| style="text-align:center;"| 1994/051995
| style="text-align:center;"| SNESGenesis
| style="text-align:center;"| Park Place
| style="text-align:center;"| Sony Imagesoft
| 
| 
|-
| style="text-align:center;"| Hardball III
| style="text-align:center;"| 1994/06
| style="text-align:center;"| SNESGenesis
| style="text-align:center;"| Mindspan
| style="text-align:center;"| Accolade
| 
| 
|-
| style="text-align:center;"| Super Bases Loaded 2
| style="text-align:center;"| 1994
| style="text-align:center;"| SNES
| style="text-align:center;"| TOSE
| style="text-align:center;"| Jaleco
| 
| 
|-
| style="text-align:center;"| Super Bases Loaded 3: License to Steal/Super Moero!! Pro Yakyuu
| style="text-align:center;"| 1994
| style="text-align:center;"| SNES
| style="text-align:center;"| TOSE
| style="text-align:center;"| Jaleco
|  (NPB)
|  (MLBPA/JPBPA)
|-
| style="text-align:center;"| Tecmo Super Baseball
| style="text-align:center;"| 1994
| style="text-align:center;"| SNES
| style="text-align:center;"| Tecmo
| style="text-align:center;"| Tecmo
| 
|  (MLBPA)
|-
| style="text-align:center;"| Jikkyō Powerful Pro Yakyū '94
| style="text-align:center;"| 1994
| style="text-align:center;"| SFC
| style="text-align:center;"| Konami
| style="text-align:center;"| Konami
|  (NPB)
|  (JPBPA)
|-
| style="text-align:center;"| World Series Baseball '95
| style="text-align:center;"| 1995
| style="text-align:center;"| Genesis
| style="text-align:center;"| Blue Sky Software
| style="text-align:center;"| Sega
| 
| 
|-
| style="text-align:center;"| Triple Play 96
| style="text-align:center;"| 1995/03/18
| style="text-align:center;"| Genesis
| style="text-align:center;"| Extended Play
| style="text-align:center;"| Electronic Arts
|
|
|-
| style="text-align:center;"| Super R.B.I. Baseball
| style="text-align:center;"| 1995/07
| style="text-align:center;"| SNES
| style="text-align:center;"| Gray Matter
| style="text-align:center;"| Time Warner Interactive
| 
| 
|-
| style="text-align:center;"| Super Power League 2/The Sporting News Baseball
| style="text-align:center;"| 1995
| style="text-align:center;"| SNES
| style="text-align:center;"|
| style="text-align:center;"| Hudson Soft
|  (NPB)
|  (MLBPA/JPBPA)
|-
| style="text-align:center;"| Frank Thomas' Big Hurt Baseball
| style="text-align:center;"| 1996/05/311996/06/051995
| style="text-align:center;"| PCPlayStationSNESGame BoyGenesisSaturn
| style="text-align:center;"| Iguana EntertainmentIguana Entertainment UKRealtime Associates (Game Boy)
| style="text-align:center;"| Acclaim Entertainment
| 
| 
|-
| style="text-align:center;"| Virtual League Baseball
| style="text-align:center;"| 1995
| style="text-align:center;"| Virtual Boy
| style="text-align:center;"| Kemco
| style="text-align:center;"| Kemco
| 
| 
|-
| style="text-align:center;"| Front Page Sports: Baseball Pro '96 Season
| style="text-align:center;"| 1996/06/31
| style="text-align:center;"| PC
| style="text-align:center;"| Dynamix
| style="text-align:center;"| Sierra On-Line
|
|
|-
| style="text-align:center;"| World Series Baseball 2
| style="text-align:center;"| 1996
| style="text-align:center;"| Genesis
| style="text-align:center;"| Blue Sky Software
| style="text-align:center;"| Sega
| 
| 
|-
| style="text-align:center;"| Ken Griffey, Jr.'s Winning Run
| style="text-align:center;"| 1996
| style="text-align:center;"| SNES
| style="text-align:center;"| Rare
| style="text-align:center;"| Nintendo
| 
| 
|-
| style="text-align:center;"| Triple Play 97
| style="text-align:center;"| 1996/06/30
| style="text-align:center;"| PCPlayStation
| style="text-align:center;"| EA Sports
| style="text-align:center;"| Electronic Arts
| 
| 
|-
| style="text-align:center;"| World Series Baseball '96
| style="text-align:center;"| 1996
| style="text-align:center;"| Genesis
| style="text-align:center;"| Blue Sky Software
| style="text-align:center;"| Sega
| 
| 
|-
| style="text-align:center;"| MLB Pennant Race
| style="text-align:center;"| 1996/09/30
| style="text-align:center;"| PlayStation
| style="text-align:center;"| Sony Interactive
| style="text-align:center;"| SCEA
| 
| 
|-
| style="text-align:center;"| 3D Baseball
| style="text-align:center;"| 1996/10/311996/11/30
| style="text-align:center;"| PlayStationSaturn
| style="text-align:center;"| Crystal Dynamics
| style="text-align:center;"| Crystal Dynamics
|
|
|-
| style="text-align:center;"| All-Star Baseball
| style="text-align:center;"| 1997
| style="text-align:center;"| Saturn
| style="text-align:center;"| Iguana Entertainment
| style="text-align:center;"| Acclaim Entertainment
|
|
|-
| style="text-align:center;"| Ken Griffey, Jr. Presents Major League Baseball
| style="text-align:center;"| 1997
| style="text-align:center;"| Game Boy
| style="text-align:center;"| Software Creations
| style="text-align:center;"| Nintendo
|
|
|-
| style="text-align:center;"| World Series Baseball '98
| style="text-align:center;"| 1997
| style="text-align:center;"| SaturnGenesis
| style="text-align:center;"| Blue Sky Software
| style="text-align:center;"| Sega
| 
| 
|-
| style="text-align:center;"| 3D Baseball: The Majors
| style="text-align:center;"| 1997/02/281997/01/31
| style="text-align:center;"| PlayStationSaturn
| style="text-align:center;"| Crystal Dynamics
| style="text-align:center;"| BMG Interactive
|
|
|-
| style="text-align:center;"| VR Baseball '97
| style="text-align:center;"| 1997/03/31
| style="text-align:center;"| PlayStation
| style="text-align:center;"| VR Sports
| style="text-align:center;"| Interplay Productions
|
|
|- style="text-align:center;"
|| Grand Slam 97
|| 1997/04/30
|| PlayStation
|| Burst Studios
|| Virgin Interactive
|
|
|-
| style="text-align:center;"| Triple Play 98
| style="text-align:center;"| 1997/06/04
| style="text-align:center;"| PCPlayStation
| style="text-align:center;"| EA Sports
| style="text-align:center;"| Electronic Arts
| 
| 
|-
| style="text-align:center;"| Aaron vs. Ruth
| style="text-align:center;"| 1997/06/30
| style="text-align:center;"| PC
| style="text-align:center;"| Mindscape
| style="text-align:center;"| Mindscape
|
|
|-
| style="text-align:center;"| Baseball Mogul
| style="text-align:center;"| 1997/06/30
| style="text-align:center;"| PC
| style="text-align:center;"| Infinite Monkey
| style="text-align:center;"| Infinite Monkey
|
|
|-
| style="text-align:center;"| MLB 98
| style="text-align:center;"| 1997/06/30
| style="text-align:center;"| PlayStation
| style="text-align:center;"| SCEA
| style="text-align:center;"| SCEA
| 
| 
|-
| style="text-align:center;"| Tony La Russa Baseball 4
| style="text-align:center;"| 1997/06/30
| style="text-align:center;"| PC
| style="text-align:center;"| Stormfront Studios
| style="text-align:center;"| Maxis
|
|
|-
| style="text-align:center;"| DSF Baseball 98
| style="text-align:center;"| 1997/11/01
| style="text-align:center;"| PC
| style="text-align:center;"| Sierra On-Line
| style="text-align:center;"| Sierra On-Line
|
|
|-
| style="text-align:center;"| Triple Play 99
| style="text-align:center;"| 1998/02/28
| style="text-align:center;"| PCPlayStation
| style="text-align:center;"| EA Sports
| style="text-align:center;"| Electronic Arts
| 
| 
|-
| style="text-align:center;"| Hardball 6
| style="text-align:center;"| 1998/03/31
| style="text-align:center;"| PC
| style="text-align:center;"| MindSpan
| style="text-align:center;"| Accolade
|
|
|-
| style="text-align:center;"| High Heat Major League Baseball 1999
| style="text-align:center;"| 1998/03/31
| style="text-align:center;"| PC
| style="text-align:center;"| Team .366
| style="text-align:center;"| 3DO
| 
| 
|-
| style="text-align:center;"| MLB 99
| style="text-align:center;"| 1998/03/31
| style="text-align:center;"| PlayStation
| style="text-align:center;"| Sony Interactive
| style="text-align:center;"| SCEA
| 
| 
|-
| style="text-align:center;"| Microsoft Baseball 3D 1998 Edition
| style="text-align:center;"| 1998/07/01
| style="text-align:center;"| PC
| style="text-align:center;"| WizBang! Software
| style="text-align:center;"| Microsoft
|
|
|-
| style="text-align:center;"| VR Baseball '99
| style="text-align:center;"| 1998/05/31
| style="text-align:center;"| PlayStation
| style="text-align:center;"| VR Sports
| style="text-align:center;"| Interplay
|
|
|- style="text-align:center;"
|| Mike Piazza's Strike Zone
|| 1998/06/16
|| Nintendo 64
|| Devil's Thumb Entertainment
|| GT Interactive
|
|
|- style="text-align:center;"
|| Bottom of the 9th '99
|| 1998/08/31
|| PlayStation
|| Konami
|| Konami
|
|
|-
| style="text-align:center;"| VR Baseball 2000
| style="text-align:center;"| 1998/09/30
| style="text-align:center;"| PC
| style="text-align:center;"| Interplay
| style="text-align:center;"| VR Sports
|
|
|-
| style="text-align:center;"| All-Star Baseball '99
| style="text-align:center;"| 1998
| style="text-align:center;"| Nintendo 64Game Boy
| style="text-align:center;"| Iguana EntertainmentRealtime Associates
| style="text-align:center;"| Acclaim Sports
|
|
|-
| style="text-align:center;"| Major League Baseball Featuring Ken Griffey Jr.
| style="text-align:center;"| 1998
| style="text-align:center;"| Nintendo 64
| style="text-align:center;"| Angel Studios
| style="text-align:center;"| Nintendo
| 
| 
|-
| style="text-align:center;"| Hardball 99
| style="text-align:center;"| 1998/10/31
| style="text-align:center;"| PlayStation
| style="text-align:center;"| MindSpan
| style="text-align:center;"| Accolade
|
|
|-
| style="text-align:center;"| MLB 2000
| style="text-align:center;"| 1999/02/28
| style="text-align:center;"| PlayStation
| style="text-align:center;"| 989 Sports
| style="text-align:center;"| SCEA
| 
| 
|-
| style="text-align:center;"| Hardball 6 2000 Edition
| style="text-align:center;"| 1999/03/29
| style="text-align:center;"| PC
| style="text-align:center;"| MindSpan
| style="text-align:center;"| Accolade
|
|
|-
| style="text-align:center;"| High Heat Major League Baseball 2000
| style="text-align:center;"| 1999/03/31
| style="text-align:center;"| PCPlayStation
| style="text-align:center;"| Team .366
| style="text-align:center;"| 3DO
| 
| 
|-
| style="text-align:center;"| Microsoft Baseball 2000
| style="text-align:center;"| 1999/04
| style="text-align:center;"| PC
| style="text-align:center;"| WizBang! Software
| style="text-align:center;"| Microsoft
|
|
|-
| style="text-align:center;"| Triple Play 2000
| style="text-align:center;"| 1999/03/31
| style="text-align:center;"| PCPlayStationNintendo 64
| style="text-align:center;"| EA Sports
| style="text-align:center;"| Electronic Arts
| 
| 
|-
| style="text-align:center;"| Baseball Edition 2000
| style="text-align:center;"| 1999/04/30
| style="text-align:center;"| PC
| style="text-align:center;"| Interplay
| style="text-align:center;"| Interplay
|
|
|-
| style="text-align:center;"| Ken Griffey, Jr.'s Slugfest
| style="text-align:center;"| 1999/04/301991/06
| style="text-align:center;"| Nintendo 64Game Boy Color
| style="text-align:center;"| Rockstar San DiegoSoftware Creations
| style="text-align:center;"| Nintendo
|
|
|-
| style="text-align:center;"| All-Star Baseball 2000
| style="text-align:center;"| 1999
| style="text-align:center;"| Nintendo 64Game Boy Color
| style="text-align:center;"| Iguana EntertainmentRealtime Associates
| style="text-align:center;"| Acclaim Sports
|
|
|- style="text-align:center;"
| Out of the Park Baseball
| 1999
| PCMac
| OOTP Developments
| OOTP Developments
|
|
|-
| style="text-align:center;"| High Heat Major League Baseball 2001
| style="text-align:center;"| 2000/03/08
| style="text-align:center;"| PCPlayStation
| style="text-align:center;"| 3DO
| style="text-align:center;"| 3DO
| 
| 
|-
| style="text-align:center;"| Backyard Baseball 2001
| style="text-align:center;"| 2000/06/06
| style="text-align:center;"| PC
| style="text-align:center;"| Humongous Entertainment
| style="text-align:center;"| Infogrames
|
|
|-
| style="text-align:center;"| All-Star Baseball 2001
| style="text-align:center;"| 2000/02/292000/04/30
| style="text-align:center;"| Nintendo 64Game Boy Color
| style="text-align:center;"| High Voltage SoftwareKnowWonder
| style="text-align:center;"| Acclaim Sports
|
|
|-
| style="text-align:center;"| MLB 2001
| style="text-align:center;"| 2000/02/29
| style="text-align:center;"| PlayStation
| style="text-align:center;"| 989 Sports
| style="text-align:center;"| SCEA
| 
| 
|- style="text-align:center;"
|| World Series Baseball 2K1
|| 2001
|| Dreamcast
|| Blue Sky Software
|| Sega
| 
| 
|-
| style="text-align:center;"| Sammy Sosa High-Heat Baseball 2001
| style="text-align:center;"| 2000/03/07
| style="text-align:center;"| PCPlayStation
| style="text-align:center;"| Team .366
| style="text-align:center;"| 3DO
|
|
|-
| style="text-align:center;"| Triple Play 2001
| style="text-align:center;"| 2000/03/312000/02/292000/04/30
| style="text-align:center;"| PCPlayStationGame Boy Color
| style="text-align:center;"| EA Sports
| style="text-align:center;"| Electronic ArtsElectronic ArtsTHQ
| 
| 
|-
| style="text-align:center;"| Microsoft Baseball 2001
| style="text-align:center;"| 2000/03
| style="text-align:center;"| PC
| style="text-align:center;"| Microsoft
| style="text-align:center;"| Microsoft
|
|
|-
| style="text-align:center;"| Gekikuukan Pro Baseball: The End of the Century 1999
| style="text-align:center;"| 2000/09/7
| style="text-align:center;"| PlayStation 2
| style="text-align:center;"| SquareSoft
| style="text-align:center;"| SquareSoftNippon Television Network Corporation
|  (NPB)
|  (JPBPA)
|-
| style="text-align:center;"| Triple Play Baseball
| style="text-align:center;"| 2001/03/042001/03/122001/03/12
| style="text-align:center;"| PCPlayStation 2PlayStation
| style="text-align:center;"| EA Sports
| style="text-align:center;"| Electronic Arts
| 
| 
|-
| style="text-align:center;"| All-Star Baseball 2002
| style="text-align:center;"| 2001
| style="text-align:center;"| PlayStation 2GameCube
| style="text-align:center;"| Acclaim Studios Austin
| style="text-align:center;"| Acclaim Sports
|
|
|-
| style="text-align:center;"| High Heat Major League Baseball 2002
| style="text-align:center;"| 2001/03/262001/03/262001/03/14
2001/09/16
| style="text-align:center;"| PCPlayStation 2PlayStation
Game Boy Advance
| style="text-align:center;"| 3DO
Möbius Entertainment (GBA)
| style="text-align:center;"| 3DO
| 
| 
|-
| style="text-align:center;"| Baseball Mogul 2002
| style="text-align:center;"| 2001/03/31
| style="text-align:center;"| PC
| style="text-align:center;"| Sports Mogul
| style="text-align:center;"| Sports Mogul
|
|
|-
| style="text-align:center;"| Out of the Park Baseball II
| style="text-align:center;"| 2001/03/31
| style="text-align:center;"| PC
| style="text-align:center;"| Out of the Park
| style="text-align:center;"| Out of the Park
|
|
|-
| style="text-align:center;"| MLB 2002
| style="text-align:center;"| 2001/05/07
| style="text-align:center;"| PlayStation
| style="text-align:center;"| 989 Sports
| style="text-align:center;"| SCEA
| 
| 
|-
| style="text-align:center;"| Season Ticket Baseball
| style="text-align:center;"| 2001/06/19
| style="text-align:center;"| PC
| style="text-align:center;"| Out of the Park
| style="text-align:center;"| WizardWorks
|
|
|-
| style="text-align:center;"| All-Star Baseball 2003
| style="text-align:center;"| 2002
| style="text-align:center;"| XboxPlayStation 2GameCubeGame Boy Advance
| style="text-align:center;"| Acclaim Studios AustinThe Creations Group Ltd.
| style="text-align:center;"| Acclaim Sports
|
|
|-
| style="text-align:center;"| High Heat Major League Baseball 2003
| style="text-align:center;"| 2002/02/12
| style="text-align:center;"| PCPlayStationPlayStation 2Game Boy Advance
| style="text-align:center;"| 3DO
Möbius Entertainment (GBA)
| style="text-align:center;"| 3DO
| 
| 
|-
| style="text-align:center;"| Out of the Park Baseball 4
| style="text-align:center;"| 2002/02/28
| style="text-align:center;"| PC
| style="text-align:center;"| Out of the Park
| style="text-align:center;"| Out of the Park
|
|
|- style="text-align:center;"
|| Triple Play 2002
|| 2002/03/11
|| PlayStation 2Xbox
|| Pandemic Studios
|| Electronic Arts
|
|
|- style="text-align:center;"
|| Home Run King
|| 2002/03/18
|| GameCube
|| Wow Entertainment
|| Sega
|
|
|-
| style="text-align:center;"| Season Ticket Baseball 2003
| style="text-align:center;"| 2002/03/24
| style="text-align:center;"| PC
| style="text-align:center;"| Out of the Park
| style="text-align:center;"| Infogrames
|
|
|-
| style="text-align:center;"| Nichibeikan Pro Baseball: Final League
| style="text-align:center;"| 2002/04/25
| style="text-align:center;"| PlayStation 2
| style="text-align:center;"| SquareSoft
| style="text-align:center;"| SquareSoftMajor League Baseball Advanced Media
|  (MLB)
|  (MLBPA/JPBPA)
|-
| style="text-align:center;"| Baseball Mogul 2003
| style="text-align:center;"| 2002/04/30
| style="text-align:center;"| PC
| style="text-align:center;"| Sports Mogul
| style="text-align:center;"| Monkeystone
|
|
|-
| style="text-align:center;"| Little League Baseball
| style="text-align:center;"| 2002/05/27
| style="text-align:center;"| GBA
| style="text-align:center;"| NewKidCo
| style="text-align:center;"| NewKidCo
|
|
|-
| style="text-align:center;"| Backyard Baseball 2003
| style="text-align:center;"| 2002/06/07
| style="text-align:center;"| PC
| style="text-align:center;"| Humongous Entertainment
| style="text-align:center;"| Infogrames
|
|
|-
| style="text-align:center;"| MLB 2003
| style="text-align:center;"| 2002/06/17
| style="text-align:center;"| PlayStation
| style="text-align:center;"| 989 Sports
| style="text-align:center;"| SCEA
| 
| 
|-
| style="text-align:center;"| MLB Slugfest 20-03
| style="text-align:center;"| 2002//06/232002/08/262003/09/03
| style="text-align:center;"| PlayStation 2XboxGameCube
| style="text-align:center;"| Gratuitous Games
| style="text-align:center;"| Midway
| 
| 
|-
| style="text-align:center;"| PureSim Baseball
| style="text-align:center;"| 2002/07/05
| style="text-align:center;"| PC
| style="text-align:center;"| PureSim
| style="text-align:center;"| PureSim
|
|
|-
| style="text-align:center;"| Baseball Addict
| style="text-align:center;"| 2002/09/27
| style="text-align:center;"| PCPocket PC
| style="text-align:center;"| Hexacto
| style="text-align:center;"| Hexacto
|
|
|-
| style="text-align:center;"| High Heat Major League Baseball 2004
| style="text-align:center;"| 2003/02/20
| style="text-align:center;"| PCPlayStation 2XboxGBA
| style="text-align:center;"| 3DO
Möbius Entertainment (GBA)
| style="text-align:center;"| 3DO
| 
| 
|-
| style="text-align:center;"| All-Star Baseball 2004
| style="text-align:center;"| 2003
| style="text-align:center;"| XboxPlayStation 2GameCubeGame Boy Advance
| style="text-align:center;"| Acclaim Studios AustinAcclaim Studios Manchester
| style="text-align:center;"| Acclaim Sports
|
|
|-
| style="text-align:center;"| Out of the Park Baseball 5
| style="text-align:center;"| 2003/02/28
| style="text-align:center;"| PC
| style="text-align:center;"| Out of the Park
| style="text-align:center;"| Out of the Park
|
|
|-
| style="text-align:center;"| Baseball Mogul 2004
| style="text-align:center;"| 2003/03/06
| style="text-align:center;"| PC
| style="text-align:center;"| Hip Games
| style="text-align:center;"| Hip Games
|
|
|- style="text-align:center;"
|| World Series Baseball 2K3
|| 2003/03/10
|| PlayStation 2Xbox
|| Visual ConceptsBlue Shift Inc.
|| Sega
|
|
|-
| style="text-align:center;"| MLB Slugfest 20-04
| style="text-align:center;"| 2003/03/16
| style="text-align:center;"| PlayStation 2XboxGameCubeGame Boy Advance
| style="text-align:center;"| Midway
| style="text-align:center;"| Midway
| 
| 
|-
| style="text-align:center;"| MVP Baseball 2003
| style="text-align:center;"| 2003/03/24
| style="text-align:center;"| PCPlayStation 2Xbox
| style="text-align:center;"| EA Sports
| style="text-align:center;"| Electronic Arts
| 
| 
|-
| style="text-align:center;"| MLB 2004
| style="text-align:center;"| 2003/04/30
| style="text-align:center;"| PlayStationPlayStation 2
| style="text-align:center;"| 989 Sports
| style="text-align:center;"| SCEA
| 
| 
|-
| style="text-align:center;"| Inside Pitch 2003
| style="text-align:center;"| 2003/05/20
| style="text-align:center;"| Xbox
| style="text-align:center;"| Microsoft
| style="text-align:center;"| Microsoft
| 
| 
|- style="text-align:center;"
|| Big League Slugger Baseball
|| 2003/07/15
|| PlayStation
|| Now Production
|| Agetec
|
|
|-
| style="text-align:center;"| MLB Slam!
| style="text-align:center;"| 2003/10/31
| style="text-align:center;"| N-Gage
| style="text-align:center;"| THQ
| style="text-align:center;"| Nokia
|
|
|-
| style="text-align:center;"| Inside the Park Baseball
| style="text-align:center;"| 2003/12/19
| style="text-align:center;"| PC
| style="text-align:center;"| Out of the Park
| style="text-align:center;"| Out of the Park
|
|
|-
| style="text-align:center;"| All-Star Baseball 2005
| style="text-align:center;"| 2004
| style="text-align:center;"| XboxPlayStation 2
| style="text-align:center;"| Acclaim Studios Austin
| style="text-align:center;"| Acclaim Entertainment
|
|
|-
| style="text-align:center;"| PureSim Baseball 2004
| style="text-align:center;"| 2004
| style="text-align:center;"| PC
| style="text-align:center;"| Shaun Sullivan
| style="text-align:center;"| Shaun Sullivan
|
|
|-
| style="text-align:center;"| MLB 2005
| style="text-align:center;"| 2004/03/04
| style="text-align:center;"| PlayStationPlayStation 2
| style="text-align:center;"| 989 Sports
| style="text-align:center;"| SCEA
| 
| 
|-
| style="text-align:center;"| ESPN Major League Baseball
| style="text-align:center;"| 2004/05/042004/04/06
| style="text-align:center;"| PlayStation 2Xbox
| style="text-align:center;"| Visual Concepts
| style="text-align:center;"| Sega
| 
| 
|-
| style="text-align:center;"| Baseball Mogul 2005
| style="text-align:center;"| 2004/05
| style="text-align:center;"| PC
| style="text-align:center;"| Sports Mogul
| style="text-align:center;"| Sports Mogul
|
|
|-
| style="text-align:center;"| MVP Baseball 2004
| style="text-align:center;"| 2004/03/09
| style="text-align:center;"| PCPlayStation 2XboxGameCube
| style="text-align:center;"| EA Sports
| style="text-align:center;"| Electronic Arts
| 
| 
|-
| style="text-align:center;"| MLB Slugfest Loaded
| style="text-align:center;"| 2004/03/09
| style="text-align:center;"| PlayStation 2Xbox
| style="text-align:center;"| Midway
| style="text-align:center;"| Midway
| 
| 
|-
| style="text-align:center;"| ESPN Ultimate Baseball Online
| style="text-align:center;"| 2005
| style="text-align:center;"| PC
| style="text-align:center;"| Netamin
| style="text-align:center;"| Netamin
|
|
|-
| style="text-align:center;"| QMotions Baseball
| style="text-align:center;"| 2005
| style="text-align:center;"| PC
| style="text-align:center;"| QMotion
| style="text-align:center;"| QMotion
|
|
|-
| style="text-align:center;"| MVP Baseball 2005
| style="text-align:center;"| 2005/02/22
| style="text-align:center;"| PCPlayStation 2XboxGameCube
| style="text-align:center;"| EA Sports
| style="text-align:center;"| Electronic Arts
| 
| 
|-
| style="text-align:center;"| Major League Baseball 2K5
| style="text-align:center;"| 2005/02/282005/02/23
| style="text-align:center;"| PlayStation 2Xbox
| style="text-align:center;"| Visual Concepts
| style="text-align:center;"| 2K Sports
| 
| 
|-
| style="text-align:center;"| MLB 2006
| style="text-align:center;"| 2005/03/08
| style="text-align:center;"| PlayStation 2
| style="text-align:center;"| 989 Sports
| style="text-align:center;"| SCEA
| 
| 
|-
| style="text-align:center;"| Baseball Mogul 2006
| style="text-align:center;"| 2005/03/15
| style="text-align:center;"| PC
| style="text-align:center;"| Sports Mogul
| style="text-align:center;"| Sports Mogul
|
|
|-
| style="text-align:center;"| MLB
| style="text-align:center;"| 2005/04/12
| style="text-align:center;"| PSP
| style="text-align:center;"| 989 Sports
| style="text-align:center;"| SCEA
|
|
|-
| style="text-align:center;"| Out of the Park Baseball 6.5
| style="text-align:center;"| 2005/06/14
| style="text-align:center;"| PC
| style="text-align:center;"| Out of the Park
| style="text-align:center;"| Out of the Park
|
|
|- style="text-align:center;"
| style="text-align:center;"| Mario Superstar Baseball
| style="text-align:center;"|  2005/08/29
| style="text-align:center;"|  GameCube
| style="text-align:center;"|  Namco
| style="text-align:center;"|  Nintendo
|
|
|-
| style="text-align:center;"| MVP 06: NCAA Baseball
| style="text-align:center;"| 2006/01/18
| style="text-align:center;"| PlayStation 2Xbox
| style="text-align:center;"| EA Sports
| style="text-align:center;"| Electronic Arts
| 
| 
|-
| style="text-align:center;"| MLB '06: The Show
| style="text-align:center;"| 2006/02/28
| style="text-align:center;"| PlayStation 2PSP
| style="text-align:center;"| SCEA
| style="text-align:center;"| SCEA
| 
| 
|-
| style="text-align:center;"| Major League Baseball 2K6
| style="text-align:center;"| 2006/04/032006/04/132006/04/102006/04/032006/06/12
| style="text-align:center;"| PlayStation 2PSPXbox 360XboxGameCube
| style="text-align:center;"|Visual Concepts
| style="text-align:center;"| 2K Sports
| 
| 
|-
| style="text-align:center;"| Baseball Mogul 2007
| style="text-align:center;"| 2006/04/12
| style="text-align:center;"| PC
| style="text-align:center;"| Sports Mogul
| style="text-align:center;"| Enlight Software
|
|
|-
| style="text-align:center;"| Ultimate Baseball Online 2006
| style="text-align:center;"| 2006/04/12
| style="text-align:center;"| PC
| style="text-align:center;"| Netamin
| style="text-align:center;"| Netamin
|
|
|-
| style="text-align:center;"| PureSim Baseball 2007
| style="text-align:center;"| 2006/05/15
| style="text-align:center;"| PC
| style="text-align:center;"| Shaun Sullivan
| style="text-align:center;"| Matrix Games
|
|
|-
| style="text-align:center;"| Out of the Park Baseball Manager 2006
| style="text-align:center;"| 2006/05/31
| style="text-align:center;"| PCMacintosh
| style="text-align:center;"| Sports Interactive
| style="text-align:center;"| Out of the Park
|
|
|-
| style="text-align:center;"| MLB Slugfest 2006
| style="text-align:center;"| 2006/06/05
| style="text-align:center;"| PlayStation 2Xbox
| style="text-align:center;"| Blue Shift
| style="text-align:center;"| Midway
| 
| 
|-
| style="text-align:center;"| Backyard Baseball 2007
| style="text-align:center;"| 2006/08/082006/08/152006/08/292006/06/12
| style="text-align:center;"| PCPlayStation 2GameCubeGBA
| style="text-align:center;"| Game Brains
| style="text-align:center;"| Atari
|-
| style="text-align:center;"| Wii Sports
| style="text-align:center;"| 2006/11/192006/12/022006/12/072006/12/08
| style="text-align:center;"| Wii
| style="text-align:center;"| Nintendo EAD
| style="text-align:center;"| Nintendo
| 
| 
|-
| style="text-align:center;"| Winnie the Pooh's Home Run Derby
| style="text-align:center;"| 2007
| style="text-align:center;"| Browser
| style="text-align:center;"| Walt Disney Japan
| style="text-align:center;"| Walt Disney JapanYahoo! Kids
| 
| 
|-
| style="text-align:center;"| MVP 07: NCAA Baseball
| style="text-align:center;"| 2007/02/06
| style="text-align:center;"| PlayStation 2
| style="text-align:center;"| EA Sports
| style="text-align:center;"| Electronic Arts
| 
| 
|-
| style="text-align:center;"| The BIGS
| style="text-align:center;"| 2007/06/25
| style="text-align:center;"| PlayStation 3PlayStation 2PSPXbox 360Wii
| style="text-align:center;"| Blue Castle Games
| style="text-align:center;"| 2K Sports
| 
| 
|- style="text-align:center;"
|| Slugger!
|| TBA
|| PlayStation 2Xbox
|| Farsight Technologies
|| Mad Catz
|
|
|-
| style="text-align:center;"| MLB 07: The Show
| style="text-align:center;"| 2007/02/26
| style="text-align:center;"| PlayStation 3PlayStation 2PSP
| style="text-align:center;"| SCEA
| style="text-align:center;"| SCEA
| 
| 
|-
| style="text-align:center;"| Major League Baseball 2K7
| style="text-align:center;"| 2007/02/26
| style="text-align:center;"| PlayStation 3PlayStation 2PSP
| style="text-align:center;"| Visual Concepts
| style="text-align:center;"| 2K Sports
| 
| 
|-
| style="text-align:center;"| MLB 08: The Show
| style="text-align:center;"| 2008/03/04
| style="text-align:center;"| PlayStation 3PlayStation 2PSP
| style="text-align:center;"| SCEA
| style="text-align:center;"| SCEA
| 
| 
|-
| style="text-align:center;"| Baseball Mogul 2008
| style="text-align:center;"| 2007/03/20
| style="text-align:center;"| Microsoft Windows
| style="text-align:center;"| Sports Mogul
| style="text-align:center;"| Sports Mogul
|
|
|- style="text-align:center;"
|| Major League Baseball 2K8
|| 2008/03/04
|| PlayStation 3PlayStation 2Xbox 360Nintendo WiiNintendo DS
|| Visual Concepts
|| 2K Sports
| 
| 
|-
| style="text-align:center;"| MLB Power Pros 2008
| style="text-align:center;"| 2008/07/29,2008/08/25,and 2008/10/03 
| style="text-align:center;"| Nintendo Wii Sony PlayStation 2Nintendo DS
| style="text-align:center;"| Konami
| style="text-align:center;"| 2K Sports
|
|
|-
| style="text-align:center;"| Baseball Mogul 2009
| style="text-align:center;"| 2008/08/15
| style="text-align:center;"| Microsoft Windows
| style="text-align:center;"| Sports Mogul
| style="text-align:center;"| Sports Mogul
|
|
|- style="text-align:center;"
| Mario Super Sluggers
| 2008/08/25
| Wii
| Namco Bandai Games
| Nintendo
|
|
|-
| style="text-align:center;"| MLB Dugout Heroes
| style="text-align:center;"| 2009/03/03
| style="text-align:center;"| PC
| style="text-align:center;"| WiseCat
| style="text-align:center;"| GamesCampus
|
|
|-
| style="text-align:center;"| Major League Baseball 2K9
| style="text-align:center;"| 2009/03/03
| style="text-align:center;"| Microsoft WindowsPlayStation 2PlayStation 3PSPXbox 360Wii
| style="text-align:center;"| Visual ConceptsKush Games
| style="text-align:center;"| 2K Sports
| 
| 
|-
| style="text-align:center;"| MLB 09: The Show
| style="text-align:center;"| 2009/03/03
| style="text-align:center;"| PlayStation 3
| style="text-align:center;"| San Diego Studio
| style="text-align:center;"| SCEA
| 
| 
|-
| style="text-align:center;"| Baseball Mogul 2010
| style="text-align:center;"| 2009/03/25
| style="text-align:center;"| Microsoft Windows
| style="text-align:center;"| Sports Mogul
| style="text-align:center;"| Sports Mogul
|
|
|-
| style="text-align:center;"| MLB World Series 2009
| style="text-align:center;"| 2009/04/10
| style="text-align:center;"| iOS
| style="text-align:center;"| Polarbit
| style="text-align:center;"| MLB Advanced Media
| 
| 
|-
| style="text-align:center;"| Major League Baseball 2K10
| style="text-align:center;"| 2010/03/09
| style="text-align:center;"| WindowsPlayStation 2PlayStation 3PSPXbox 360Wii
| style="text-align:center;"| Visual Concepts
| style="text-align:center;"| 2K Sports
| 
| 
|-
| style="text-align:center;"| MLB 10: The Show
| style="text-align:center;"| 2010/03/09
| style="text-align:center;"| PlayStation 3
| style="text-align:center;"| San Diego Studio
| style="text-align:center;"| SCEA
| 
| 
|-
| style="text-align:center;"| Baseball Mogul 2011
| style="text-align:center;"| 2010/03/26
| style="text-align:center;"| Microsoft Windows
| style="text-align:center;"| Sports Mogul
| style="text-align:center;"| Sports Mogul
|
|
|-
| style="text-align:center;"| MLB 11: The Show
| style="text-align:center;"| 2011/03/07
| style="text-align:center;"| PlayStation 3
| style="text-align:center;"| San Diego Studio
| style="text-align:center;"| SCEA
| 
| 
|- style="text-align:center;"
|| Major League Baseball 2K11
|| 2011/03/07
|| PlayStation 3PlayStation 2Xbox 360Nintendo Wii
|| Visual Concepts
|| 2K Sports
| 
| 
|-
| style="text-align:center;"| MLB 12: The Show
| style="text-align:center;"| 2012/03/06
| style="text-align:center;"| PlayStation 3PlayStation Vita
| style="text-align:center;"| San Diego Studio
| style="text-align:center;"| SCEA
| 
| 
|- style="text-align:center;"
|| Major League Baseball 2K12
|| 2012/03/06
|| Microsoft WindowsPlayStation 3Nintendo WiiXbox 360PlayStation 2
|| Visual Concepts
|| 2K Sports
| 
| 
|-
| style="text-align:center;"| Strategy Baseball
| style="text-align:center;"| 2013
| style="text-align:center;"| PC
| style="text-align:center;"| Steven Lucey
| style="text-align:center;"| Strategy Baseball
| 
| 
|- style="text-align:center;"
|| Major League Baseball 2K13
|| 2013/03/05
|| PlayStation 3Xbox 360
|| Visual Concepts
|| 2K Sports
| 
| 
|-
| style="text-align:center;"| MLB 13: The Show
| style="text-align:center;"| 2013/03/05
| style="text-align:center;"| PlayStation 3PlayStation Vita
| style="text-align:center;"| San Diego Studio
| style="text-align:center;"| SCEA
| 
| 
|- style="text-align:center;"
|| Major League Baseball 2K13
|| 2013/03/05
|| PlayStation 3Xbox 360
|| Visual Concepts
|| 2K Sports
| 
| 
|-
| style="text-align:center;"| MLB 14: The Show
| style="text-align:center;"| 2014/04/012014/05/06 (PS4)
| style="text-align:center;"| PlayStation 3PlayStation VitaPlayStation 4
| style="text-align:center;"| San Diego Studio
| style="text-align:center;"| SCEA
| 
| 
|-
| style="text-align:center;"| R.B.I. Baseball 14
| style="text-align:center;"| 2014/04/08
| style="text-align:center;"| AndroidiPhonePlayStation 3PlayStation 4Xbox 360Xbox One
| style="text-align:center;"| MLB Advanced Media
| style="text-align:center;"| MLB Advanced Media
| 
| 
|-
| style="text-align:center;"| Baseball Mogul 2015
| style="text-align:center;"| 2014/04/11
| style="text-align:center;"| Microsoft Windows
| style="text-align:center;"| Sports Mogul
| style="text-align:center;"| Sports Mogul
|
|
|-
| style="text-align:center;"| Super Mega Baseball
| style="text-align:center;"| 2014/12/16
| style="text-align:center;"| PlayStation 3PlayStation 4Xbox OneSteam
| style="text-align:center;"| Metalhead Software
| style="text-align:center;"| Metalhead Software
|
|
|-
| style="text-align:center;"| Tamagotchi Baseball
| style="text-align:center;"| 2015/03/01
| style="text-align:center;"| Nintendo Wii UNintendo 3DS
| style="text-align:center;"| Namco Bandai Games
| style="text-align:center;"| Bandai
|
|
|-
|- style="text-align:center;"
|| Out of the Park Baseball 16
|| 2015/03/23
|| Microsoft WindowsMacLinux
|| Out of the Park Developments
|| Out of the Park Developments
| 
| 
|-
| style="text-align:center;"| MLB 15: The Show
| style="text-align:center;"| 2015/03/31 
| style="text-align:center;"| PlayStation 3PlayStation VitaPlayStation 4
| style="text-align:center;"| San Diego Studio
| style="text-align:center;"| SCEA
| 
| 
|-
| style="text-align:center;"| R.B.I. Baseball 15
| style="text-align:center;"| 2015/03/31
| style="text-align:center;"| iPhoneSteamPlayStation 4Xbox One
| style="text-align:center;"| MLB Advanced Media
| style="text-align:center;"| MLB Advanced Media
| 
| 
|-
|- style="text-align:center;"
|| Out of the Park Baseball 17
|| 2016/03/22
|| Microsoft WindowsMacLinux
|| Out of the Park Developments
|| Out of the Park Developments
| 
| 
|-
| style="text-align:center;"| Baseball Mogul 2016
| style="text-align:center;"| 2016/03/21
| style="text-align:center;"| Microsoft Windows
| style="text-align:center;"| Sports Mogul
| style="text-align:center;"| Sports Mogul
|
|
|-
| style="text-align:center;"| R.B.I. Baseball 16
| style="text-align:center;"| 2016/03/29
| style="text-align:center;"| SteamPlayStation 4Xbox One
| style="text-align:center;"| MLB Advanced Media
| style="text-align:center;"| MLB Advanced Media
| 
| 
|-
| style="text-align:center;"| MLB 16: The Show
| style="text-align:center;"| 2016/03/29 
| style="text-align:center;"| PlayStation 3PlayStation 4
| style="text-align:center;"| San Diego Studio
| style="text-align:center;"| SCEA
| 
| 
|-
| style="text-align:center;"| Mario Sports Superstars
| style="text-align:center;"| 2017/03/10
| style="text-align:center;"| Nintendo 3DS
| style="text-align:center;"| Camelot Software PlanningBandai Namco Games
| style="text-align:center;"| Nintendo
|
|
|-
| style="text-align:center;"|Out of the Park Baseball 18
| style="text-align:center;"|2017/03/24
| style="text-align:center;"|Microsoft WindowsMacLinux
| style="text-align:center;"|Out of the Park Developments
| style="text-align:center;"|Out of the Park Developments
| 
| 
|-
| style="text-align:center;"| R.B.I. Baseball 17
| style="text-align:center;"| 2017/03/28
| style="text-align:center;"| SteamPlayStation 4Xbox OneNintendo Switch
| style="text-align:center;"| MLB Advanced Media
| style="text-align:center;"| MLB Advanced Media
| 
| 
|-
| style="text-align:center;"| MLB The Show 17
| style="text-align:center;"| 2017/03/28 
| style="text-align:center;"| PlayStation 4
| style="text-align:center;"| San Diego Studio
| style="text-align:center;"| SCEA
| 
| 
|-
| style="text-align:center;"| R.B.I. Baseball 18
| style="text-align:center;"| 2018/03/20
| style="text-align:center;"|PlayStation 4Xbox OneNintendo Switch
| style="text-align:center;"| MLB Advanced Media
| style="text-align:center;"| MLB Advanced Media
| 
| 
|-
| style="text-align:center;"| MLB The Show 18
| style="text-align:center;"| 2018/03/27 
| style="text-align:center;"| PlayStation 4
| style="text-align:center;"| San Diego Studio
| style="text-align:center;"| SCEA
| 
| 
|-
| style="text-align:center;"| R.B.I. Baseball 19
| style="text-align:center;"| 2019/03/05
| style="text-align:center;"|PlayStation 4Xbox OneNintendo SwitchAndroidiOS
| style="text-align:center;"| MLB Advanced Media
| style="text-align:center;"| MLB Advanced Media
| 
| 
|-
| style="text-align:center;"| MLB The Show 19
| style="text-align:center;"| 2019/03/26 
| style="text-align:center;"| PlayStation 4
| style="text-align:center;"| San Diego Studio
| style="text-align:center;"| SCEA
| 
| 

|-
| style="text-align:center;"| MLB The Show 20
| style="text-align:center;"| 2020/01/14
| style="text-align:center;"| PlayStation 4
| style="text-align:center;"| San Diego Studio
| style="text-align:center;"| SCEA
|-
| style="text-align:center;"| Blaseball
| style="text-align:center;"| 2020/07/20
| style="text-align:center;"| Web
| style="text-align:center;"| The Game Band
| style="text-align:center;"| The Game Band
| 
| 
|
|-
| style="text-align:center;"| MLB The Show 21
| style="text-align:center;"| 2021/04/20
| style="text-align:center;"| PlayStation 4PlayStation 5Xbox OneXbox Series X/S
| style="text-align:center;"| San Diego Studios
| style="text-align:center;"| SCEA
| 
| 
|-
| style="text-align:center;"| MLB The Show 22
| style="text-align:center;"| 2022/04/05
| style="text-align:center;"| PlayStation 4PlayStation 5Xbox OneXbox Series X/SNintendo Switch
| style="text-align:center;"| San Diego Studio
| style="text-align:center;"| SCEA
| 
|

References

Baseball video games
 
Timelines of video games